Brooktondale is a hamlet (and census-designated place) in Tompkins County, New York, United States. Brooktondale has a post office with ZIP code 14817, which opened on July 30, 1832.

External links

References

Hamlets in Tompkins County, New York
Hamlets in New York (state)